Connor may refer to the following:

People 
 Connor (given name), list of people with this name
 Connor (surname)
 Harriet Connor Brown (1872-1962), American writer and women's rights activist

Places and jurisdictions 

 Connor, County Antrim, a town in Northern Ireland, seat of:
 the present Anglican Diocese of Connor (Church of Ireland)
 the former Roman Catholic Diocese of Connor, merged into the present Diocese of Down and Connor
 Connor Downs, Cornwall, England 
 Connor, Maine, unincorporated area in Aroostook County, Maine, United States
 Mount Connor, Northern Territory, Australia
 Connor Battle, Tongue River, American Civil War

Other uses

 Connor (retailer), an Australian and New Zealand clothing retail chain

See also 
 
 Conor
 Conner (disambiguation)
 Connors (disambiguation)
 O'Connor (disambiguation)
 Justice Connor (disambiguation)